The A. Lincoln class is a series of six container ships built for CMA CGM. The ships were built by Hyundai Heavy Industries in South Korea. The ships have a maximum theoretical capacity of 14,414 TEU. The ships were ordered in 2015 with scheduled delivery early 2017. 

On 22 August 2017  set a new record for the largest ever container ship to cross the new Panama Canal. It held the record until 2019 when a larger container ship passed through the canal..The class is named after some of the most famous US presidents.

List of ships

See also

References 

Container ship classes
Ships built by Hyundai Heavy Industries Group
Ships of CMA CGM